Aymar Aristiguieta is a Venezuelan model and pageant titleholder, born in Valencia, Venezuela on November, 1983, and grew up in Barquisimeto, Venezuela. Aristiguieta represented the state of Lara in the Miss Venezuela 2006 pageant, on September 14, 2006.

References

External links
 Miss Venezuela Official Website
 Miss Venezuela La Nueva Era MB

1983 births
Living people
People from Barquisimeto
People from Valencia, Venezuela
Venezuelan female models